Senator Heitmeier may refer to:

David Heitmeier (born 1961), Louisiana State Senate
Francis C. Heitmeier (born 1950), Louisiana State Senate